"Kasa wo Motanai Aritachi wa" is a 2016 Japanese short drama series consisting of four twenty-five minute episodes (stories) directed by . It was released in Japan by Fuji TV weekly from January 9 to January 30. The series is based on the collection of short stories, of the same title, by Shigeaki Kato.

Plot 
Jun Hashimoto is an unsuccessful sci-fi novel writer who struggles with a task given by his manager. To write a short love themed story for a magazine directed towards young people. One evening he is visited by his home town friend Keisuke Murata. While catching up, Keisuke tries to help Jun, by bringing up different ideas and kinds of love.

Cast 
 Renn Kiriyama
 Shigeaki Kato
 Masanobu Sakata
 Nao Minamisawa
 Rika Adachi
 Mai Watanabe
 Chise Niitsu
 Raita Ryu
 Ryota Kobayashi
 Riku Ichikawa
 Rina Takeda

References

External links 
  
 

Japanese drama television series
Fuji TV original programming
2016 Japanese television series debuts
2016 Japanese television series endings